Eschborn–Frankfurt, previously Rund um den Henninger Turm Frankfurt, is an annual semi classic cycling race in Germany, starting in Eschborn and finishing in Frankfurt. The event, sometimes referred to as the Frankfurt Grand Prix, is held annually on 1 May, national Labour Day in Germany.

As from 2017, Eschborn–Frankfurt is part of the UCI World Tour, the highest-rated professional men's road races, making it the second German World Tour event, together with the Hamburg Cyclassics in August. The event is organised by ASO.

History
The event was first held on 1 May 1962, as Rund um den Henninger Turm Frankfurt, starting and finishing in Frankfurt's city centre. Brothers Hermann and Erwin Moos sought to promote the Henninger Tower, a grain silo belonging to the Henninger Brewery, which opened in 1961. Henninger served as main sponsor of the cycling event from the inaugural race until 2008. Rund um den Henninger Turm received a status upgrade in 1967 when Paris–Brussels, organised in late April, was removed from the calendar due to traffic problems and the event became the pre-eminent one-day cycling race in West Germany.

The race's first winner was Belgian Armand Desmet in 1962. Barry Hoban became the first British winner in 1966 after a 50 km solo ride to the finish, holding the chasing pack at one minute. Legendary cyclist Eddy Merckx won the race solo in 1971. Sprinter Erik Zabel held the record for most victories in the race with three (1999, 2002 and 2005) until Alexander Kristoff in 2018 added a fourth victory to his 2014, 2016 and 2017 wins, and therefore becoming sole record-holder. Seven further riders have won twice.

In 1995, Rund um den Henninger Turm was part of the UCI Road World Cup, cycling's season-long competition of the most important one-day races in the 1990s. The fixed date of the event however, every 1 May, was considered unfavourable as it was often midweek, and it was replaced with the newly created HEW Cyclassics in Hamburg as the German leg of the series.

In 2008, organiser Bernd Moos stated Henninger would withdraw its sponsorship of the race. Henninger discontinued its funding after 46 years because of economic conditions. The event continued in 2009 as the Eschborn–Frankfurt City Loop, named after its city sponsors, Frankfurt and the neighboring town of Eschborn, which also became the start location of the race. The iconic Henninger Tower was demolished in 2013.

The 2015 event was cancelled on the eve of the race due to a suspected terrorist plot; the 2020 edition was cancelled due to the COVID-19 pandemic. In 2017, Eschborn–Frankfurt was included in the UCI World Tour, cycling's highest rated professional events, and organisation was taken on by ASO, which also organises cycling's flagships, the Tour de France and Paris–Roubaix.

Route
The race passes through the Taunus Hills west of Frankfurt, along a winding and hilly course with around 1500m (5,000 feet) of climbing. The climbs of the Feldberg, Ruppershain and Mammolshain are some of the regular features. The Mammolshain has a maximal gradient of 26% and is climbed twice in the race.

Until 2008 the start and finish of the race was on Hainer Weg and later Darmstädter Landstraße, in front of the Henninger Tower.

Since 2010, the finish is in front of the Alte Oper (Old Opera), Frankfurt's concert hall and former opera house in the city centre.

Race winners

References

 
UCI World Tour races
Cycle races in Germany
Rund um den Henninger-Turm
Sports competitions in Frankfurt
Recurring sporting events established in 1962
1962 establishments in West Germany
UCI Europe Tour races
UCI Road World Cup races
Taunus
Super Prestige Pernod races
Inline speed skating competitions